John Singleton (1968–2019) was an American film director, screenwriter and producer.

John Singleton may also refer to:

Jockeys
John Singleton (jockey, born 1715), first rider to Lord Rockingham between 1760 and 1780
John Singleton (jockey, died c. 1789), his nephew, also rider to Lord Rockingham and winner of the first running of the St. Leger Stakes in 1776
John Singleton (jockey, born 1776), his son, who rode the winner of the 1797 Derby

Judges
John Singleton (British judge) (1885–1957), British Lord Justice of Appeal and Member of Parliament for Lancaster, 1922–1923
John Virgil Singleton Jr. (1918–2015), U.S. federal judge

Other people
John Singleton (athlete) (1896–1937), American professional baseball and football player
John Singleton (Australian entrepreneur) (born 1941)
John Singleton (philanthropist)  (1808–1891), Australian philanthropist, co-founder of Melbourne City Mission
John Andrew Singleton (1895–1970), civil rights activist, dentist, and member of the Nebraska House of Representatives 
 John B. Singleton, former city council member and police commissioner in Myrtle Beach, South Carolina, United States, for whom John B. Singleton Parkway is named

See also
Jon Singleton (accountant), public servant in Manitoba, Canada
Jon Singleton (baseball) (born 1991), American baseball player
Jonathan Singleton, country music songwriter, or his band, Jonathan Singleton & the Grove